Mahmudiyeh (also Romanized as Maḩmūdīyeh) is a village in Rezvan Rural District, Ferdows District, Rafsanjan County, Kerman Province, Iran. At the 2006 census, its population was 120, in 31 families.

References 

Populated places in Rafsanjan County